"Magnifico" is a song performed by Italian rapper and singer Fedez featuring vocals from Francesca Michielin. It was originally written by Roberto Casalino and Dario Faini, and later re-worked by Fedez, who wrote rap verses on the song. The song was released as a digital download on 31 October 2014 through Sony Music Entertainment Italy. The song is included on his fourth studio album Pop-Hoolista (2014). The song peaked to number 1 on the Italian Singles Chart.

Music video
A music video to accompany the release of "Magnifico" was first released onto YouTube on 31 October 2014 at a total length of three minutes and thirty-eight seconds. Fedez and Francesca are seen alternating each other with their part. Fedez is accompanied by different women who come and go one after another. At the last scene every body is seen together in chorus, singing together.

Track listing

Chart performance

Weekly charts

Release history

References

2014 songs
2014 singles
Fedez songs
Francesca Michielin songs
Songs written by Roberto Casalino
Songs written by Dario Faini
Number-one singles in Italy